The FIS Nordic World Ski Championships 1989 took place 17–26 February 1989 in Lahti, Finland, for a record fifth time (1926, 1938, 1958, 1978). The women's 5 km was not held after being reintroduced in the previous championships. These championships featured separate races of men's 15 km and women's 10 km both in the classical technique and in the freestyle technique. Additionally, the women's 15 km event debuted and the women's 20 km event was lengthened to 30 km.

Men's cross-country

15 km classical 
22 February 1989

15 km freestyle 
20 February 1989

30 km classical 
18 February 1989

50 km freestyle 
26 February 1989

4 × 10 km relay
24 February 1989

Among the 19 relay teams competing were Australia, Denmark, Greece, and the Netherlands.

Women's cross-country

10 km classical 
19 February 1989

10 km freestyle 
17 February 1989

15 km classical 
21 February 1989

30 km freestyle 
25 February 1989

4 × 5 km relay
24 February 1989

Men's Nordic combined

15 km individual Gundersen
18/19 February 1989

3 × 10 km team
23/24 February 1989

Men's ski jumping

Individual normal hill 
26 February 1989

The event was originally scheduled for 25 February, however, due to adverse weather conditions it was postponed to the following day. Due to strong winds no second round took place and results were taken from the first round.

Individual large hill 
20 February 1989

Team large hill
22 February 1989

Medal table
Medal winners by nation.

References
FIS 1989 cross-country results
FIS 1989 Nordic combined results
FIS 1989 ski jumping results

External links
 

The event at SVT's open archive 

FIS Nordic World Ski Championships
Nordic Skiing
1989 in Nordic combined
1989 in Finnish sport
February 1989 sports events in Europe
Nordic skiing competitions in Finland
Sports competitions in Lahti